Łukasz Seweryn (born 26 October 1982) is a Polish professional basketball player who last played for Czarni Słupsk in the Polish Basketball League (PLK). He is known for his three-point shooting.

Professional career
In June 2014, Seweryn signed a two-year contract with Czarni Słupsk, returning to the team for a third stint.

Personal life
Seweryn and his wife Natalia own a small chain of resort holiday homes in northern Poland, 600 meters from the coast.

Honours

Club
Asseco Gdynia
Polish Basketball League: 2010, 2011, 2012

Basket Zielona Góra
Polish Basketball League: 2013

References

External links
 Eurobasket.com profile
 PLK profile (in Polish)

Living people
1982 births
Polish men's basketball players
Guards (basketball)
Forwards (basketball)
AZS Koszalin players
Stal Ostrów Wielkopolski players
KK Włocławek players
Basket Zielona Góra players
Place of birth missing (living people)